The 2022 24H Touring Car Endurance Series powered by Hankook is the seventh season of the Touring Car Endurance Series (TCES). Creventic is the organiser and promoter of the series. The races are contested with TCR Touring Cars, TCX cars and TC cars.

Calendar

† – Non-championship round.
The following events where scheduled to take place but were cancelled.

Teams and drivers

Race Results
Bold indicates overall winner.

Notes

References

External links

24H TCE
24H TCE Series
2022 in 24H Series